The Infiniti Etherea is a concept car that was announced at the 2011 Geneva Motor Show made by the Infiniti division of Nissan Motors. 

The Etherea is a front-wheel drive compact executive 5-door hatchback with 5 seats and not dissimilar in size and concept to the Lexus CT200h and is built on the same platform as the Nissan Qashqai and Renault Mégane.

The Etherea is powered by a supercharged 2.5-litre I4 petrol engine producing  with a  lithium-ion battery-powered electric motor to maintain momentum.

References

External links
Infiniti Etherea concept page

Etherea
2010s cars
Cars introduced in 2011
Front-wheel-drive vehicles
Compact cars
Hatchbacks